is a private school, Japanese school located in Oakland, New Jersey, United States in the New York City metropolitan area. It is one of the two Japanese day schools operated by the Japanese Educational Institute of New York (JEI; ニューヨーク日本人教育審議会 Nyūyōku Nihonjin Kyōiku Shingi Kai), a nonprofit organization which also operates two Japanese weekend school systems in the New York City area.

The school's students are Japanese expatriates. It has 53 students in grades 1–9 with a student-teacher ratio of 4 to 1. The goal of the school is to prepare them for the Japanese educational system when the students eventually return to Japan. It occupies space rented from the Our Lady of Perpetual Help Church.  it had 90 students.

History
The Japanese School of New York established a branch campus in New Jersey on April 1, 1992, with grades one through four.

Its original enrollment was 13, but by May 1993 it had 60 students. That month, the school employed three Americans as teachers, while Japanese people had other teaching positions.

On April 1, 1999, the branch campus became its own school, The New Jersey Japanese School.

See also

 Japanese in New York City
 Japanese Weekend School of New York - Japanese weekend school in the New York City area
 New York Seikatsu Press
 American School in Japan, American international school in Tokyo

References

Further reading
 西田 直嗣 and 鈴木 晶子. "A Creative Music Composition to Student in The New Jersey Japanese School : To Make Tone Row" (ニュージャージー日本人学校における「創造的音楽学習」の取り組み : 音列を創る). 群馬大学教育学部紀要. 芸術・技術・体育・生活科学編 47, 17–25, 2012. 群馬大学教育学部. See profile at CiNii.

External links
 
 
 The Japanese Educational Institute of New York 

1999 establishments in New Jersey
Japanese-American culture in New Jersey
Educational institutions established in 1999
Japanese international schools in the United States
New Jersey
Schools in Oakland, New Jersey
Private K–8 schools in New Jersey